Poliosia pulverea is a moth in the family Erebidae. It was described by George Hampson in 1900. It is found on Borneo. The habitat consists of forests on limestone.

References

Moths described in 1900
Lithosiina